Svegs IK is a Swedish sports club located in Sveg.

Background
Svegs IK currently plays football in Division 4 Jämtland/Härjedalen which is the sixth tier of Swedish football. They play their home matches at the Svegs IP in Sveg.

The club is affiliated to Jämtland-Härjedalens Fotbollförbund.

The club is also active in bandy, ice hockey and skiing.

Season to season

In their most successful period Svegs IK competed in the following divisions:

In recent seasons Svegs IK have competed in the following divisions:

Footnotes

External links
 Svegs IK – Official website

Football clubs in Jämtland County
Bandy clubs in Sweden
Association football clubs established in 1906
Bandy clubs established in 1906
1906 establishments in Sweden